In probability theory and statistics, the geometric Poisson distribution (also called the Pólya–Aeppli distribution) is used for describing objects that come in clusters, where the number of clusters follows a Poisson distribution and the number of objects within a cluster follows a geometric distribution. It is a particular case of the compound Poisson distribution. 

The probability mass function of a random variable N distributed according to the geometric Poisson distribution  is given by

 

where λ is the parameter of the underlying Poisson distribution and θ is the parameter of the geometric distribution.

The distribution was described by George Pólya in 1930. Pólya credited his student Alfred Aeppli's 1924 dissertation as the original source. It was called the geometric Poisson distribution by Sherbrooke in 1968, who gave probability tables with a precision of four decimal places.

The geometric Poisson distribution has been used to describe systems modelled by a Markov model, such as biological processes or traffic accidents.

See also 

 Poisson distribution
 Compound Poisson distribution
 Geometric distribution

References

Bibliography

Further reading 

 

Poisson distribution